Sultan Nasiruddin I Sri Veeru Abarana Mahaa Radun was the sultan of the sultanate of Maldives. He ascended to the Lion throne of Maldives in 1409 after the death of Sultan Hassan Al Hilaaly I. Sultan Nasiruddine ruled the country for three years until his death in 1411. It is believed that he was a descendant of lunar dynasty.

1411 deaths
Year of birth unknown
15th-century sultans of the Maldives